Aleksandr Petrovich Lisovsky (born 29 April 1975) is a Belarusian association football coach and former player.

Career

Lisovsky started his career with Ataka-407 Minsk.

Honours
BATE Borisov
Belarusian Premier League champion: 1999, 2002

Personal life
His son Roman Lisovskiy is also a professional footballer.

References

External links
 
 

1975 births
Living people
Footballers from Minsk
Belarusian footballers
Association football midfielders
Belarus international footballers
FC Ataka Minsk players
FC Molodechno players
FC BATE Borisov players
FC Torpedo-BelAZ Zhodino players
FC Smorgon players
Belarusian football managers
FC Smorgon managers
FC Torpedo Zhodino managers
FC BATE Borisov managers
Belarus under-21 international footballers